Ganjehi-ye Kohneh (also Romanized as Ganjeh’ī-ye Kohneh; also known as Ganjeh, Ganjeh Kohneh, Ganjeh-ye Kohneh, and Kanjeh) is a village in Sarrud-e Shomali Rural District, in the Central District of Boyer-Ahmad County, Kohgiluyeh and Boyer-Ahmad Province, Iran. At the 2006 census, its population was 812, in 168 families.

References 

Populated places in Boyer-Ahmad County